Cystiphora schmidti, the rush skeletonweed gall midge, is a species of gall midges in the family Cecidomyiidae.

References

Further reading

 
 

Cecidomyiinae
Gall-inducing insects
Articles created by Qbugbot
Insects described in 1914